Banksia polycephala, commonly known as many-headed dryandra, is a species of bushy shrub that is endemic to Western Australia. It has linear, pinnatisect leaves with up to twenty-five triangular lobes on each side, small, creamy yellow flowers in heads of up to seventy and egg-shaped follicles.

Description
Banksia polycephala is a bushy shrub that typically grows to a height of  but does not form a lignotuber. There are between ten and twenty-five sharply-pointed, triangular lobes on each side of the leaf lamina and one or two short teeth on the petiole. Only up to three follicles form in each head.

Taxonomy and naming
This species was first formally described in 1870 by George Bentham who gave it the name Dryandra polycephala and published the description in Flora Australiensis from specimens collected by James Drummond.

In 2007 Austin Mast and Kevin Thiele transferred all dryandras to the genus Banksia and renamed this species Banksia polycephala.

Distribution and habitat
The many-headed dryandra only occurs in an area between New Norcia and Bindoon where it grows in woodland with Eucalyptus wandoo.

Conservation status
This banksia is classified as "not threatened" by the Western Australian Government Department of Parks and Wildlife.

References

 

polycephala
Plants described in 1870
Taxa named by George Bentham